Peter Bermel (born 25 June 1967) is a retired German swimmer who won a bronze medal at the 1985 European Aquatics Championships. He also competed at the 1988 Summer Olympics and finished fifth and eights in the 200 m and 400 m medley events, respectively. 

Bermel started swimming in a club at age 4-5 and by 13 was a member of the national junior team. In 1983 he won the European Youth Championships in medley and backstroke events. In 1991, after qualifying for the World Cup in Australia he retired from competitive swimming. By 2000, he returned to the pool to compete in the masters category. This was a difficult task as he started smoking and gained weight up to 112 kg, but he quickly shed 20 kg by training. 
 
He is a married to Monika and has a son, Thore (b. 1998), and a daughter, Lena-Sophie (b. 1996). Both children are competitive swimmers, and Lena-Sophie already won a silver medal at the European Junior Swimming Championships in Antwerp (2012). They live in Elmshorn.

References

1967 births
German male swimmers
Swimmers at the 1988 Summer Olympics
Olympic swimmers of West Germany
Living people
European Aquatics Championships medalists in swimming
Male medley swimmers
Sportspeople from Hamburg
20th-century German people
21st-century German people